Anthemis plutonia, the Troödos chamomile, is a pilose perennial herb in the sunflower family found only in Cyprus. It often forms intricate mats with prostrate stems 5–20 cm long. Small bipinnatisect leaves. Capitula 15–20 mm in diameter, with pink rarely creamy-white tubular florets. Suborbicular ray-florets white, rarely pink.

Habitat
Very common in dry igneous hillsides with sparse vegetation, vineyards, roadsides in the Troödos Mountains and Stavrovouni, where it grows from 250 m altitude up to the highest peaks at 1950 m.

Distribution
An endemic of Cyprus where it is restricted to the  Troödos range: Stavros Psokas, Prodromos, Khionistra, Kryos Potamos, The Troödos forest, Palekhori, Makheras and Stavrovouni. Flowers March–July.

References

External links
Flora of Cyprus
photo
photo
photo
photo

plutonia
Endemic flora of Cyprus
Plants described in 1983